Events from the year 2006 in Macau, China.

Incumbents
 Chief Executive - Edmund Ho
 President of the Legislative Assembly - Susana Chou

Events

January
 23 January - Macau became the world's largest gambling center, surpassing Las Vegas Strip in the United States.

March
 1 March - The opening of Communications Museum in Nossa Senhora de Fátima.

May
 7 May - The opening of Museum of Taipa and Coloane History in Taipa.

June
 3 June - 2006 Hong Kong–Macau Interport at Macau University of Science and Technology Sports Field.

July
 19–23 July - 2006 Macau Open Badminton Championships at Tap Seac Multi-sports Pavilion.

September
 6 September - The opening of Wynn Macau in Sé.

October
 7–15 October - 2006 Lusophony Games at Macau Stadium.

December
 31 December - The official opening of Macau Fisherman's Wharf in Sé.

References

 
Years of the 21st century in Macau
Macau
Macau
2000s in Macau